The Bagg Street Shul or Beth Shloime (formally Congregation Temple Solomon) is an Orthodox synagogue located at the intersection of Clark Street and Bagg Street in the Montreal Plateau region of Montreal, Quebec, Canada.

In the early 1900s, fueled by heavy immigration, Jews established a large community in Montreal's Plateau region, around Saint Laurent Boulevard, that supported at least a dozen synagogues at its peak. It started to decline in the 1950s, as many Jews moved further west in Montreal or to other parts of Canada. The Bagg Street Shul is the only synagogue still remaining.

The synagogue's building, a red-brick duplex on Clark Street, was constructed in 1899. The congregation purchased the building and moved there in 1922. The sanctuary seats 350. The Torah ark, marble staircase, pews, bimah furniture, and chandeliers were moved to the synagogue from the McGill College location of the Congregation Shaar Hashomayim Synagogue. These items were purchased from the Shaar Hashomayim in 1918 for $1,500 ($ today). The building is recognized as a heritage site by Quebec's Minister of Culture, and by the City of Montreal.

The Bagg Street Shul is the oldest synagogue still operating with its original congregation in its original location in Quebec. , the congregation had 50 member families.

References

External links

Orthodox synagogues in Canada
Synagogues completed in 1899
Synagogues in Montreal
Le Plateau-Mont-Royal
19th-century religious buildings and structures in Canada